Longjiang is the atonal pinyin romanization of various Chinese names, particularly  or , meaning "DragonRiver". The same name also sometimes occurs as Lung Chiang, Keang, or Kiang. It may refer to:

Places

Rivers
 Long River (Guangxi)
 Long River (Fujian)
 Jiulong River, a river in southern Fujian formerly known as the Longjiang

Provinces
 Longjiang Province, a former province in Heilongjiang

Counties
 Longjiang County in Qiqihar Prefecture, Heilongjiang

Subdistricts
 Longjiang Subdistrict, Fuqing, Fujian
 Longjiang Subdistrict, Linghe District, in the city of Jinzhou

Towns
 Longjiang, Huilai County (隆江镇), Huilai County, Guangdong
 Longjiang, Foshan, Guangdong
 Longjiang, Qionghai, Hainan
 Longjiang, Yongfu County, Guangxi

Other
 Longjiang-1 and Longjiang-2, two Chinese microsatellites launched in May 2018 with the Queqiao satellite
 Lung Chiang, a US built patrol boat of the Republic of China Navy
 Longjiang Formation, Lower Cretaceous Formation in Inner Mongolia.

See also

 Long River (disambiguation)
 Long Jiang
 Long (disambiguation)
 Jiang (disambiguation)